The Missouri Valley Conference (also called MVC or simply "The Valley") is the third-oldest collegiate athletic conference in the United States. The conference's members are primarily located in the midwest.

History
 
The MVC was established in 1907 as the Missouri Valley Intercollegiate Athletic Association or MVIAA, 12 years after the Big Ten, the only Division I conference that is older. It is the third oldest college athletic conference in the United States, after the Big Ten Conference and the NCAA Division III Michigan Intercollegiate Athletic Association (MIAA). The MVIAA split in 1928, with most of the larger schools forming a conference that retained the MVIAA name; this conference evolved into the Big Eight Conference. The smaller MVIAA schools (Drake, Grinnell and Washington University in St. Louis), plus Oklahoma A&M (now Oklahoma State University–Stillwater, which joined the Big Eight in 1957), were joined by Creighton to form the MVC, which retained the old MVIAA's administrative staff.  The Big Eight merged with four Texas schools of the Southwest Conference to form the Big 12 Conference in 1996.

To this day, it has never been definitively established which conference was the original and which was the spinoff, though the Big Eight would go on to become the more prestigious of the two. During the Big Eight's run, both conferences claimed 1907 as their founding date, and the same history through 1927.

MVC teams held a 74–27 non-conference record during the 2006–07 college basketball season, including a record of 44–1 at home. The Valley finished in the top six of the RPI and ahead of a BCS conference for the second consecutive year, while also garnering multiple NCAA bids for the ninth straight year and 12th of 14.

The MVC has not sponsored football since 1985, when it was a hybrid I-A/I-AA (now FBS and FCS, respectively) conference. However, five members have football programs in the Missouri Valley Football Conference (MVFC) (known as the Gateway from 1985 to 2008) of Division I FCS, and two others compete in another FCS conference, the Pioneer Football League. The Missouri Valley Conference shares its name with the MVFC, and all three conferences operate from the same headquarters complex in St. Louis; however, the three are separate administratively.

After weeks of speculation, Wichita State announced on April 7, 2017, that it would leave the conference to join the American Athletic Conference starting with the 2017–18 season. The conference announced it extended an invitation to Valparaiso University on May 9, 2017; and on May 25, the MVC announced that Valparaiso would officially join the following July 1.

The most recent changes to the core MVC membership were announced during the 2021–22 school year. On September 28, 2021, the MVC and Belmont University jointly announced that the school would leave the Ohio Valley Conference for the MVC effective July 1, 2022. Then, on November 16, Loyola University Chicago announced it would leave the MVC at the same time, joining the Atlantic 10 Conference. On the same day Loyola announced its departure, CBS Sports reported that the MVC was actively pursuing further expansion, having entered into talks with the University of Missouri–Kansas City (known athletically as Kansas City), Murray State University, and the University of Texas at Arlington (UT Arlington). The report indicated that the latter two were considered the strongest candidates, but that all three were likely to receive invitations in the coming months. On January 7, 2022, the MVC announced that Murray State would officially join the conference on July 1 of that year. UT Arlington would soon remove itself from the list of candidates by announcing a 2022 move to the Western Athletic Conference.

Shortly before Murray State was officially announced as an incoming MVC member, Matt Brown of the Extra Points college sports blog reported that the MVC was also in membership discussions with the University of Illinois Chicago (UIC), then a member of the Horizon League. On the same weekend that Murray State's arrival was officially announced, MVC officials made a site visit to UIC. Brown's sources indicated that an invitation to UIC was likely. Brown noted that with the MVC losing Loyola, league officials believed that maintaining a presence in the city was a top priority, stating (emphasis in original): 

On January 22, 2021, Matt Norlander of CBSSports.com reported that UIC's July 2022 entry to the MVC was "a done deal", with his sources indicating that the MVC wanted to announce the move before the Conference Commissioners Association held its annual meeting in Naples, Florida in early February. UIC's entry was officially announced on January 26.

Member schools

Current members

Notes

Affiliate members
Note: In the case of spring sports, the year of joining is the calendar year before the start of competition.

Notes

Future affiliate members

Notes

Former members

Former full members (25)

Notes

Former affiliate members
This list does not include current full members Belmont and Valparaiso. As noted above, the Bruins played men's soccer in the MVC for the 2000 fall season (2000–01 school year), and the Beacons, then known as the Crusaders, played women's soccer in the MVC from the 1996 to 1998 fall seasons (1996–97 to 1998–99 school years).

Notes

Membership timeline

Commissioners
 C. E. McClung (1907–19??)
 Arthur (Artie) E. Eilers (1925–1957)
 Norvell Neve (1957–1969)
 DeWitt T. Weaver (1969–1972)
 Mickey Holmes (1972–1979)
 David Price (1979–1981)
 Richard D. Martin (1981–1985)
 James A. Haney (1985–1988)
 Doug Elgin (1988 – 2021)
 Jeff Jackson (2021 – Present)

Sports

The Missouri Valley Conference sponsors championship competition in seven men's and ten women's NCAA sanctioned sports. Little Rock and Marshall are affiliates for swimming and diving and SIU Edwardsville is an affiliate in men's soccer.

The most recent change to the roster of sports was the dropping of men's tennis after the 2016–17 school year due to a lack of participating teams. Two of the four full conference members that sponsored the sport in that season no longer play men's tennis in the MVC. Southern Illinois dropped both men's and women's tennis, and Wichita State joined the American Athletic Conference. Affiliate member Stony Brook dropped men's tennis after the 2016–17 season. The two remaining MVC men's tennis schools from 2016 to 2017, Drake and Illinois State, joined the Summit League for that sport, and incoming MVC member Valparaiso also joined the Summit League in men's tennis.

Men's sponsored sports by school

Men's varsity sports not sponsored by the Missouri Valley Conference which are played by Valley schools:

Women's sponsored sports by school

Women's varsity sports not sponsored by the Missouri Valley Conference which are played by Valley schools:

Facilities
Future members in gray.

 Note
 For the football venues of schools who participate in the sport, see Facilities of the Missouri Valley Football Conference and Facilities of the Pioneer Football League.

Basketball tournament champions by year

The Missouri Valley Conference men's basketball tournament is often referred to as Arch Madness, in reference to the Gateway Arch at the tournament's present location of St. Louis, Missouri, and a play on "March Madness". The women's tournament is currently promoted as Hoops in the Heartland.

NB: Missouri State was known as Southwest Missouri State until August 2005.

Postseason History Multiple Bids 

 
Sports in the Midwestern United States
Sports organizations established in 1907
1907 establishments in the United States
Articles which contain graphical timelines